Eden Giselle Silva (born 14 March 1996) is a British tennis player and model of Russian and Sri Lankan descent.

She has career-high WTA rankings of 300 in singles, achieved on 30 January 2023, and 126 in doubles, reached on 3 February 2020.

Silva made her WTA Tour main-draw debut at the 2018 Dubai Tennis Championships, in the doubles draw, partnering Lisa Ponomar.

Personal
Silva is from Gants Hill in East London. She has also done modelling work, after being scouted by an agency through Instagram.

Grand Slam performance timelines

Singles

Doubles

ITF Circuit finals

Singles: 6 (2 titles, 4 runner-ups)

Doubles: 24 (10 titles, 14 runner-ups)

Notes

References

External links
 
 
 
 

1996 births
Living people
English female tennis players
Sportspeople from Essex
British people of Sri Lankan descent
British people of Russian descent
Tennis people from Greater London